Artūras Javtokas (born January 27, 1977) is a retired Lithuanian professional basketball player. He is the older brother of Lithuania national team member Robertas Javtokas.

References

1977 births
Living people
BC Žalgiris players
Clemson Tigers men's basketball players
Lithuanian men's basketball players
Lithuanian expatriate basketball people in the United States
Sportspeople from Šiauliai
Centers (basketball)
Power forwards (basketball)